Top Five is a 2014 American comedy film written and directed by Chris Rock. Produced by Scott Rudin and Eli Bush, the film stars Rock, Rosario Dawson, and Gabrielle Union, and follows New York City comedian and film star Andre Allen (Rock), who has to confront his past and comedic career while doing an interview with journalist Chelsea Brown (Dawson).

The ensemble cast features comedians J. B. Smoove, Kevin Hart, Sherri Shephard, Michael Che, Tracy Morgan, Jay Pharoah, Leslie Jones, and Cedric the Entertainer. Comedians Jerry Seinfeld, Adam Sandler, and Whoopi Goldberg appear as themselves.

It was screened in the Special Presentations section of the 2014 Toronto International Film Festival and was released in the United States on December 12, 2014 by Paramount Pictures. It received critical acclaim, with praise directed at the performances of the cast, and Rock's screenplay and direction, as well as comparisons to Woody Allen's Stardust Memories (1980).

Plot

New York Times reporter Chelsea Brown is spending a day interviewing comedian and recovering alcoholic Andre Allen, star of the hit film franchise Hammy The Bear, about a cop in a bear suit. Chelsea has forgotten her audio recorder, so they first go to her apartment. While there they discuss a magazine article about the Cinderella complex. Chelsea explains that Cinderella left something behind to let the prince know that she wanted to see him again.

Andre is attempting a foray into serious films with  Uprize, in which he portrays Haitian Revolution figure Dutty Boukman, and is sensitive to criticism, particularly by Times critic James Nielson, whose previous reviews of Andre's work have been negative and insulting. As the interview begins in his limousine, Andre recalls his lowest point, when he was in Houston in 2003 and met Jazzy Dee, who supplied him with drugs, alcohol and women. When Jazzy refused to pay the women, they contended they were raped, leading to Andre's arrest and subsequent sobriety.

After the limo gets hit by a cab, Andre and Chelsea wander the city. Andre stops at a jewelry store to pick up the rings for his wedding to reality-TV star Erica Long. Following a subtle, tense interaction with Andre assisting an acquaintance who is actually his father, they visit the apartment of Andre's old friends and his ex-girlfriend. Chelsea interviews each, learning that Andre wasn't particularly funny when he started in stand-up comedy. They nominate their five favorite rappers, including a sixth in their lineups as well. Andre goes to radio shows such as Opie and Anthony to promote Uprize and attends a press conference with fellow stars including Taraji P. Henson and Gabourey Sidibe. To his chagrin, Andre is asked when there will be another Hammy movie.

At a hotel, Andre and Chelsea unexpectedly encounter her boyfriend, Brad, along with his friend Ryan, who is wearing Brad's shirt. Chelsea deduces Brad is cheating on her with Ryan. She and Andre, both recovering alcoholics, stop in a liquor store but resist making a purchase. Chelsea explains in graphic detail how the signs were there that Brad was gay. Andre laughs, calling Chelsea naive. She becomes angry and insults his movie, but the two end up kissing. Andre asks to borrow Chelsea's phone, since his own died. While using it, he sees an email from her editor, revealing James Nielson is Chelsea herself. The truth devastates Andre, who angrily tells Chelsea he felt he was never funny unless he was drunk or high, and now is fearful for his career. Despondent and acting out at a supermarket, he is arrested by police.

In jail, Andre calls Erica, who fumes over the arrest, mainly because of how it will look for her image. She tells Andre this piece of fame is all she has since she thinks she has no other talent. Erica's manager Benny takes the phone and tells Andre to go to his bachelor party for good press and fly out for the wedding. Andre's bodyguard Silk bails out Andre, and they go to a strip club for a bachelor party with a theme based on Hammy The Bear. There, Andre hangs out with Jerry Seinfeld, Adam Sandler, and Whoopi Goldberg. They give him different views on marriage and sex. Andre runs into Chelsea, who wants to make it up to him and invites him to follow her.

Andre, Chelsea, and Silk go to the Comedy Cellar, where Andre gets up onstage and performs standup for the first time in years. He turns out to still be funny, and the crowd loves him. After the performance, he tells Chelsea he got inspired to return to standup after being in jail and talking to DMX, who told Andre he does not want to keep rapping and wants to sing instead. DMX then sings "Smile", terribly.

They drop Chelsea off at her place, where she and Andre share one last kiss before departing. Andre asks for her top five rappers, which she lists. While driving away, Silk tells Andre he should have gone after Chelsea. Andre goes through the gift bag from the party and finds items including a scented candle and a bottle of vodka. Then he pulls out a slipper, and Silk smiles.

After the credits begin rolling, the movie returns to the party, where Jerry Seinfeld shares his "top five" as Sugarhill Gang, Eminem, Wale, Ice Cube, and Sir Mix-a-Lot.

Cast

 Chris Rock as Andre Allen
 Rosario Dawson as Chelsea Brown, a journalist assigned to interview Andre
 Gabrielle Union as Erica Long, Andre's fiancée
 Kevin Hart as Charles, Andre's Ivy League-educated agent 
 Sherri Shepherd as Vanessa, Andre's ex-girlfriend who still lives in the neighborhood
 J. B. Smoove as Silk, Andre's "security guard/assistant" who is never far from his boss's side
 Romany Malco as Benny Barnes 
 Hayley Marie Norman as Tammy
 Karlie Redd as Rhonda 
 Rachel Feinstein as Publicist 
 Dan Naturman as Young Comic 
 Rick Shapiro as Biker AA Guy 
 Greer Barnes as Uprize Actor
 Leslie Jones as Lisa 
 Whoopi Goldberg as Herself
 Jerry Seinfeld as Himself
 Adam Sandler as Himself
 Tracy Morgan as Fred
 Anders Holm as Brad
 Matthew Wilkas as Ryan
 Cedric the Entertainer as Jazzy Dee
 Opie and Anthony as Themselves
 Michael Che as Paul 
 Ben Vereen as Carl Allen, Andre's Father
 Brian Regan as Engineer 
 Jay Pharoah as Mike 
 Hassan Johnson as Craig 
 Doug Stanhope as Police Officer
 Tichina Arnold as Theatre Manager 
 Luis Guzmán as Himself 
 Julie Halston as Cell Phone Lady 
 Míriam Colón as Chelsea's Grandmother 
 Olga Merediz as Chelsea's Mom 
 Taraji P. Henson as Herself
 Gabourey Sidibe as Herself 
 DMX as Himself
 Charlie Rose as Himself
 Bruce Bruce as Himself

Production
Principal photography began on June 24, 2013, in New York City. In July 2014, the film's title was changed from Finally Famous to Top Five.

Release
The film premiered at the 2014 Toronto International Film Festival on September 6, 2014. On September 10, 2014, Paramount Pictures confirmed their acquisition of the film's worldwide distribution rights for $12.5 million and agreed to pay at least $20 million in promotion and marketing. In November 2014, Paramount announced Top Five would receive a wide release on December 12, 2014.

Home media
Top Five was released on Blu-ray and DVD on March 17, 2015.

Reception
Review aggregation website Rotten Tomatoes, gives the film an approval rating of 85%, based on 186 reviews, with an average rating of 7.2/10. The site's critical consensus reads, "As smart, funny, and trenchant as writer-director-star Chris Rock's best standup work, Top Five is a career highlight for its creator—and one of the comedy standouts of 2014." Metacritic gives the film a score of 81 out of 100, based on 37 reviews, indicating "universal acclaim".

Some critics found similarities between the Andre Allen character and Woody Allen's Sandy Bates in Stardust Memories (1980).

Accolades

Future
In an interview with Complex, Rock said he meets with producer Scott Rudin "every week now going over this next movie", and that Rudin wants him "to work at a faster pace". He also suggested that "a lot of the same cast" would be involved, mentioning "you might want to see see a little more of Leslie Jones or Tracy [Morgan], once he gets better. I think Jerry Seinfeld showed us things we haven't seen."

The 2016 Tyler Perry comedy film, Boo! A Madea Halloween, is based on a fictional film featured in Top Five.

See also
List of black films of the 2010s

References

External links
 
 
 
 
 
 

2014 films
2014 comedy films
2014 independent films
American comedy films
American independent films
2010s English-language films
Films scored by Ludwig Göransson
Films about actors
Films directed by Chris Rock
Films produced by Scott Rudin
Films set in New York City
Films shot in New York City
2010s hip hop films
Paramount Pictures films
Films with screenplays by Chris Rock
Haitian Revolution films
Films about comedians
Films about weddings in the United States
Films about alcoholism
Films about journalism
2010s American films